This is a list of notable events in country music that took place in the year 1994.

Events
 January 8 — Star, Mississippi, native Faith Hill hits paydirt with her first single release, "Wild One". The song spends four weeks atop the Billboard magazine Hot Country Singles & Tracks chart, the longest for a debut release by a female artist since Connie Smith's debut "Once a Day" in 1964.
 January 30 — Clint Black, Wynonna Judd, Travis Tritt and Tanya Tucker perform the halftime show (billed as "Rockin' Country Sunday") at Super Bowl XXVIII. The finale featured a special appearance by Naomi Judd, who joined Wynonna in performing The Judds' single "Love Can Build a Bridge" (their first major appearance together since their "Farewell Tour" of 1991), to which everyone eventually joined in.
 March – Tim McGraw's first major hit, "Indian Outlaw," causes considerable controversy due to lyrics about Native Americans, and the single is boycotted at a handful of stations. Nevertheless, the song's notoriety helps spur its popularity and allows it to become just the second major crossover hit in 10 years, reaching No. 15 on the Billboard magazine Hot 100 singles chart (in addition to its No. 8 peak on the Hot Country Singles & Tracks chart); the song will also jumpstart McGraw's fledgling career, which had gotten off to a less-than-stellar start a year earlier.
 Incidentally, McGraw's first taste of success comes at approximately the same time as that of his wife-to-be — Faith Hill. At this point, their careers are on separate paths.
 April 12 — The premiere issue of Country Weekly magazine hits the store shelves. Garth Brooks graces the cover of the first issue.
 May 9 — Newcomer artist John Berry passes out during a concert and is rushed to a hospital in Atlanta, where an operation is performed to remove a cyst found in the third ventricle of his brain.
October 1 - CMT adds six new music video programs to its schedule: Big Ticket, Signature Series, Jammin' Country, Saturday Nite Dance Ranch, Delivery Room and Top 12 Countdown. All shows would be cancelled in 2001.

Top hits of the year

Singles released by American artists

Singles released by Canadian artists

Top new album releases

Other top albums

Births
 May 4 – RaeLynn, country music star of the 2010s, best known for "God Made Girls."
 November 8 – Lauren Alaina, runner-up of the 10th season of American Idol, with follow-up successes including "Like My Mother Does."

Deaths

Hall of Fame inductees

Bluegrass Music Hall of Fame inductees
Osborne Brothers
Bobby Osborne
Sonny Osborne

Country Music Hall of Fame inductees
Merle Haggard (1937–2016)

Canadian Country Music Hall of Fame inductees
Dick Damron
Hank Smith

Major awards

Grammy Awards
Best Female Country Vocal Performance — "Shut Up and Kiss Me", Mary Chapin Carpenter
Best Male Country Vocal Performance — "When Love Finds You", Vince Gill
Best Country Performance by a Duo or Group with Vocal — "Blues for Dixie", Asleep at the Wheel and Lyle Lovett
Best Country Collaboration with Vocals — "I Fall to Pieces", Aaron Neville and Trisha Yearwood
Best Country Instrumental Performance — "Young Thing", Chet Atkins
Best Country Song — "I Swear", Gary Baker (songwriter), Frank J. Myers (Performer: John Michael Montgomery)
Best Country Album — Stones in the Road, Mary Chapin Carpenter
Best Bluegrass Album — The Great Dobro Sessions, Various Artists (Producers: Jerry Douglas and Tut Taylor)

Juno Awards
Country Male Vocalist of the Year — Charlie Major
Country Female Vocalist of the Year — Michelle Wright
Country Group or Duo of the Year — Prairie Oyster

Academy of Country Music
Entertainer of the Year — Reba McEntire
Song of the Year — "I Swear", Gary Baker, Frank J. Myers (Performer: John Michael Montgomery)
Single of the Year — "I Swear", John Michael Montgomery
Album of the Year — Not a Moment Too Soon, Tim McGraw
Top Male Vocalist — Alan Jackson
Top Female Vocalist — Reba McEntire
Top Vocal Duo — Brooks & Dunn
Top Vocal Group — The Mavericks
Top New Male Vocalist — Tim McGraw
Top New Female Vocalist — Chely Wright
Top New Vocal Duo or Group — The Mavericks
Video of the Year — "The Red Strokes" – Garth Brooks (Director: Jon Small)

ARIA Awards 
(presented in Sydney on March 30, 1994)
Best Country Album - Three Chain Road (Lee Kernaghan)

Canadian Country Music Association
Bud Country Fans' Choice Award — Prairie Oyster
Male Artist of the Year — Charlie Major
Female Artist of the Year — Patricia Conroy
Group or Duo of the Year — Prairie Oyster
SOCAN Song of the Year — "I'm Gonna Drive You Out of My Mind", Charlie Major, Barry Brown
Single of the Year — "I'm Gonna Drive You Out of My Mind", Charlie Major
Album of the Year — The Other Side, Charlie Major
Top Selling Album — In Pieces, Garth Brooks
Video of the Year — "Stolen Moments", Jim Witter
Vista Rising Star Award — Susan Aglukark
Vocal Collaboration of the Year — Quartette

Country Music Association
Entertainer of the Year — Vince Gill
Song of the Year — "Chattahoochee", Alan Jackson and Jim McBride (Performer: Alan Jackson)
Single of the Year — "I Swear", John Michael Montgomery
Album of the Year — Common Thread: The Songs of the Eagles, Various Artists
Male Vocalist of the Year — Vince Gill
Female Vocalist of the Year — Pam Tillis
Vocal Duo of the Year — Brooks & Dunn
Vocal Group of the Year — Diamond Rio
Horizon Award — John Michael Montgomery
Music Video of the Year — "Independence Day", Martina McBride (Directors: Robert Deaton and George J. Flanigen IV)
Vocal Event of the Year — "Does He Love You", Reba McEntire and Linda Davis
Musician of the Year — Mark O'Connor

Further reading
Kingsbury, Paul, "The Grand Ole Opry: History of Country Music. 70 Years of the Songs, the Stars and the Stories," Villard Books, Random House; Opryland USA, 1995
Whitburn, Joel, "Top Country Songs 1944–2005 – 6th Edition." 2005.

References

Other links
Country Music Association
Inductees of the Country Music Hall of Fame

External links
Country Music Hall of Fame

Country
Country music by year